Sven-Olov Sjödelius (13 June 1933 – 29 March 2018) was a Swedish sprint canoeist who competed from the early 1950s to the early 1960s. He won two gold medals in the K-2 1000 m event at the 1960 and 1964 Olympics, as well as three medals at the ICF Canoe Sprint World Championships.

References

External links

Sven-Olov Sjödelius. Swedish Olympic Committee

1933 births
2018 deaths
Canoeists at the 1960 Summer Olympics
Canoeists at the 1964 Summer Olympics
Olympic canoeists of Sweden
Olympic gold medalists for Sweden
Swedish male canoeists
Olympic medalists in canoeing
ICF Canoe Sprint World Championships medalists in kayak
Medalists at the 1964 Summer Olympics
Medalists at the 1960 Summer Olympics
People from Nyköping Municipality